Gjoko Zajkov (born 10 February 1995) is a Macedonian professional footballer who plays as a defender for Romanian Liga I club Universitatea Craiova.

Early career
Zajkov began his football career with FK Rabotnički.

Club career
Born in Skopje into a family originally from Udovo, Gjoko Zajkov was playing in Macedonia for the youth team of Rabotnichki, until the summer in 2012 when he made his first appearance for the senior team of the club, competing in the Macedonian First League. He was voted best defender that year, at the age of 17.

On 23 June 2014 he left Macedonia for the French club Stade Rennais F.C., with whom he signed a three-year contract. After his first season in France, where he spent the majority of the time playing for the youth team of Rennais only, in the summer of 2015 he was loaned for one year to Charleroi in Belgium.

After being released from Charleroi, Zajkov signed a one-year deal with Levski Sofia in August 2021. In March 2022 he joined Slavia Sofia until the end of the season.

In January 2023 he signed for Universitatea Craiova.

International career
He has been a member of Macedonian U-19 and U-21 national teams.

He made his senior debut for Macedonia in a June 2016 friendly match against Iran and has, as of May 2020, earned a total of 12 caps, scoring no goals.

He represented the nation at UEFA Euro 2020, their first major tournament.

Career statistics

Club

International

International goals
As of match played 11 October 2020. North Macedonia score listed first, score column indicates score after each Zajkov goal.

Honours

Rabotnički
1. MFL: 2013–14
Macedonian Football Cup: 2013–14

References

External links
 
Profile at Macedonian Football 

1995 births
Living people
Footballers from Skopje
Association football central defenders
Macedonian footballers
North Macedonia youth international footballers
North Macedonia under-21 international footballers
North Macedonia international footballers
FK Rabotnički players
Stade Rennais F.C. players
R. Charleroi S.C. players
PFC Levski Sofia players
FC Vorskla Poltava players
PFC Slavia Sofia players
CS Universitatea Craiova players
Macedonian First Football League players
Belgian Pro League players
First Professional Football League (Bulgaria) players
Liga I players
UEFA Euro 2020 players
Macedonian expatriate footballers
Expatriate footballers in France
Macedonian expatriate sportspeople in France
Expatriate footballers in Belgium
Macedonian expatriate sportspeople in Belgium
Expatriate footballers in Bulgaria
Macedonian expatriate sportspeople in Bulgaria
Expatriate footballers in Ukraine
Macedonian expatriate sportspeople in Ukraine
Expatriate footballers in Romania
Macedonian expatriate sportspeople in Romania